Acheronaster tumidus is a species of sea stars in the family Oreasteridae. It is in the monotypic genus Acheronaster.

References

Oreasteridae
Asteroidea genera
Monotypic echinoderm genera